James Westmoreland, (born 24 June 1988 at Wyton, East Yorkshire), also known as 'Westy', is an English motorcycle racer. In the 2019-2020 season, he will ride a Suzuki GSX-R1000 in the World Endurance Championship.

Westmoreland competed in the British 125 cc and the British Superbike Championship. After finishing twice runner up in the competitive British 125GP field he moved into Supersport for 2007, where he claimed the Cup Championship in his debut season. A move into the main supersport class for 2008 saw him spend several seasons running at the front, taking fourteen podiums and four wins with a best Championship standing of second (just behind eventual World Supersport Champion Sam Lowes).

In 2012, he competed in the British Superbike Championship with Team WFR and achieved the riders cup for that season, finishing 7th in the Championship and narrowly missing out on the Showdown.

In 2016, he competed in the British Supersport Championship aboard a Yamaha YZF-R6.

In 2018, he finished 3rd in the British Supersport Championship with Gearlink Kawasaki, with several podium finishes including a win at the final round at Brands Hatch. Westmoreland  rejoined Gearlink Kawasaki for the remainder of the 2019 British Supersport Championship.

For the 2019-2020  World Endurance Championship, he joined Superbike team R2CL aboard the Suzuki GSX-R1000 alongside teammates Clinton Sellar and Sheridan Morias. 

Westmoreland previously took victory at the 24 hours Le Mans in April 2019 at Team 50 Motors Events, finishing first in the Superstock class and 7th overall. . The Motors Events 50 team also finished a strong third in the Bol D'or 24 hour. 

For 2020, Westmoreland will ride for Gearlink Kawasaki in the British Supersport Championship.

Career

Early career
Westmoreland began racing motocross in 1995, and switched to circuit racing in 2001. He was runner-up in the British 125cc championship in both 2005 and 2006.

British Supersport Championship 2007-10
In 2007 Westmoreland moved up to the British Supersport Championship with the Centurion Racing team. Entered in the Cup class for private teams, he came 9th overall in the standings with a best of 4th at Thruxton, winning the privateers' cup that year.
In 2008, he finished 4th overall, with second places at Knockhill and Croft.

In 2009, he set up his own JW Racing team just 2 weeks before the season, to campaign Glen Richards' 2008 championship winning Triumph Daytona 675. He started the season slowly with midpoint finishes, but he came into form at Snetterton, grabbing a 3rd place; results continued to improve with a 2nd at Knockhill, and his first supersport win came at Brands Hatch GP. A second win at Silverstone sealed his third place in the championship.

British Superbike Championship 
2015: 19th - JG Speedfit Kawasaki

2014: 13th - Buildbase BMW

2013: 5th - Buildbase BMW

2012: 7th - Team WFR Honda

2011: 14th - Motorpoint Yamaha

British Supersport Championship 
2020: Gearlink Kawasaki

2019: Gearlink Kawasaki

2018: 3rd Gearlink Kawasaki

2016: Came BPT Yamaha

2010: 2nd - Came Yamaha

2009: 3rd - JW Racing Triumph

2008: 4th - Centurion Honda

2007: 7th - Centurion Honda

British Supersport Cup Championship 
2007: CHAMPION - Centurion Honda

World Supersport Championship 
2010: 11th - British Round (Silverstone)

2009: 11th - British Round (Donington Park)

British 125GP Championship 
2006: 2nd - KRP Honda

2005: 2nd - KRP Honda

2004: 28th - Team Nvidia Honda

Junior Championships 
2005: CHAMPION - ACU Academy Championship

2003: MRO 125cc Championship

2002: 5th - Aprilia Superteen Championship

Other Achievements 
2005: Spanish 125cc Championship

2001: Road Racing

1995-2000: Schoolboy Motor-cross

Career statistics
Stats correct as of 14 September 2013

All time

1. – Total includes all British Superbike Championship rides, riding in the Evolution class doesn't count as a separate ride.

By championship

British Supersport Championship

Supersport World Championship

British Superbike Championship

References

External links
Personal Website
BSS Profile

1988 births
Living people
Sportspeople from Kingston upon Hull
British Supersport Championship riders
British motorcycle racers
English motorcycle racers
British Superbike Championship riders
Supersport World Championship riders